is a Japanese fantasy comedy seinen manga series written and illustrated by . The series is published in Enterbrain's Harta magazine.  Yen Press has licensed the series in North America. An anime television series adaptation by Studio Trigger has been announced.

Plot
In a fantasy world of dungeon exploration, guilds go out on expeditions to raid dungeons. Many hope to find the mysterious Golden Kingdom, which is said to be the treasure of a certain island dungeon.
The story begins as a group of six adventurers attempt to slay a dragon; however, they are forced to escape, losing the leader's sister, Falin (a tallman spellcaster), to the dragon's stomach. After this failure, two members of the group leave to join another band of adventurers, leaving only the leader Laios (a tallman swordsman), Chilchuck (a halfling locksmith), and Marcille (an elven spellcaster) to grieve over Laios’ sister, Falin.

Feeling indebted to their close teammate Falin, who used magic to teleport the team outside to safety, the remainder of the team brainstorms how to get back to the dungeon level with the dragon in time to save Falin from digestion. Much like older versions of Dungeons & Dragons, the team members must consider the cost of weapons, defense, recruitment fees for more team members, and food.

With the majority of their supplies left behind in the dungeon, their mission seems impossible - until Laios suggests they sustain themselves by finding food inside the dungeon. Laios has secretly wanted to eat dungeon monsters for a long time, and presents Chilchuck and Marcille with a cookbook about making meals from monsters in an attempt to convince them of his plan. They agree reluctantly, and return to the dungeon.
The first floor of the dungeon is filled with adventurers and resembles a marketplace; this is where the team meets and joins Senshi, a dwarf who has 10 years of experience sustaining himself in the dungeon by cooking monsters and harvesting food.

The story then details their travels through the dungeon, the environments, traps, and monsters they encounter, and the meals they create. The pros and cons of these meals, and the characters' reactions to them, provide a running gag.

Characters

A "tallman" (トールマン tōruman), or human, who must venture deep into a dungeon to rescue his sister Falin before she is digested by the red dragon that defeated his party. Laios is a strong fighter and the leader of the party, but is also tactless. He is a very calm and gentle person who is excited to try different monster meals. He often uses the knowledge gained from cooking monsters to develop techniques to defeat them. He tends to speak very quickly when excited.

A half-elf magician who fights with magic cast from a tall wooden staff. She is a cautious person who is usually hesitant and even sometimes unwilling to eat monsters. She is very skilled at different kinds of magic and is often able to perform complicated or high-power spells with little preparation, although her skill is under-appreciated by her companions. She is an original member of Laios’ party.

A "half-foot" (ハーフフット hāfufutto), or halfling, locksmith with good dexterity and keen senses. Chilchuck disables traps, finds hidden pathways, pickpockets for the group. He is a sensible person who often admonished Laios for his tactless behaviour and obsession with monsters, but deep down he truly cares about his companions. He doesn’t like it when other people take over his job or take needless risks. He avoids combat as a rule, but can use a bow and arrow. He is an original member of Laios’ party.

A dwarf warrior who joins the party so he can fulfill his dream of cooking the red dragon Laios and his party have set out to kill. Senshi has an immense knowledge of the dungeon and the monsters within it, and is an expert chef. He typically fights with a large axe, but always carries a pot and cooking utensils. He makes sure the party are well fed and have a balanced diet to keep them going through the dungeon.

A tallman (human) spell-caster and Laios' sister, who was eaten by a red dragon at the bottom of the dungeon after using her magic to teleport the rest of the party to safety. Laios and his party are on a journey to rescue and revive her before the month-long digestion cycle of the dragon ends and she can no longer be resurrected. She has a unique ability to communicate with ghosts, and used it to keep her party safe and remove ghosts possessing corpses. She is a gentle person who shares her brother's love of monsters. She is an original member of Laios’ party.

A young tallman (human) woman who was kidnapped and made into a beast-man at the age of 6. She shares her form with the essence of a Big Cat, a monster that resembles a large cat. Having been bought by Toshiro's father, she traveled with them until she met Laios' party, at which point she parted from Toshiro's party to follow Laios in order to find a cure for her body. She is very independent and apathetic in most situations, but will step up to protect her companions when needed. 

A mollusk-like creature from the "living armor" monsters that takes the shape of a sword, which Laios adopted to replace his original sword (the ken meaning 剣 ken or tsurugi "sword"). It fidgets when it senses monsters, but also occasionally runs away when extremely frightened and cannot be drawn from its scabbard when rattling too much. Its sensitivity makes it unreliable, but helpful when exploring the dungeon.

A dwarf fighter and an original member of Laios' party. However, she has since departed to work with the Tances instead. She is an expert in weapons and has a wealth of knowledge on types of metal and weapons. She has a somewhat brash personality.

, 
A tallman (human) fighter from a distant island. He is actually part of a noble family and was exploring the dungeon to improve his skill, but fell in love with Falin after watching her observe a caterpillar. After Falin's death and being warped to the surface, he returns to the dungeon with several retainers (including Izutsumi) to rescue her. He has a reserved personality and was often a victim of Laios' lack of social awareness.

A tallman (human) fighter who leads a separate party exploring The Island's dungeon. He is very interested in people, including their goals and relationships, but dislikes monsters due to a past trauma involving a different dungeon. While he is very motivated to reach the bottom of the dungeon and solve its mysteries, his party is not very strong and have been wiped out several times. He hates fighting monsters and monster food, but he is a skilled fighter against other humans. He is charming and talented at reading people and understanding situations with little information.

Media

Manga
Ryōko Kui began publishing the series in Enterbrain's Harta magazine on February 15, 2014.  North American publisher Yen Press announced their license to the series on October 28, 2016.

Chapters not yet in volume format
 86. 
 87. 
 88. 
 89. 
 90. 
 91. 
 92.

Promotion
In 2017, a stop motion animation, subtitled , was released on YouTube to commemorate the release of the manga's fifth volume. In 2019, an animated commercial produced by Studio Trigger was released to promote the manga's eighth volume.

Anime
In August 2022, it was announced that the series would be receiving an anime television series adaptation produced by Studio Trigger.

Reception
Volume 1 reached the 11th place on the  weekly Oricon manga charts and it was the 87th best-selling manga volume in Japan from November 17, 2014 to May 17, 2015, with 315,298 copies sold. As of August 16, 2015, it had sold 381,614 copies. Volume 2 reached the 3rd place on the charts and, as of September 17, 2015, had sold 362,906 copies. As of August 2017, the first 4 volumes had over 2 million copies in print.

The manga was chosen as the 13th best manga of 2015 in the Book of the Year manga ranking of Da Vinci magazine.  The 2016 edition of the Kono Manga ga Sugoi! guidebook ranked the series at number one on its list of top 20 manga for male readers.

See also
Drifting Dragons, another manga about eating monsters but with dragons instead
Terrarium in Drawer, another manga by the same author
Toriko, another manga about cooking monsters but with heavier emphasis on fighting than slice-of-life snapshots and comedy

References

External links
 

Anime series based on manga
Comedy anime and manga
Cooking in anime and manga
Enterbrain manga
Fantasy anime and manga
Seinen manga
Studio Trigger
Upcoming anime television series
Yen Press titles